Pascal Fantodji is a Beninese professor and founder of the Communist Party of Benin (PCB). In the Benin presidential election of 1996, Fantodji received 1.08 percent of the vote (failing to qualify for the second round).

References

Year of birth missing (living people)
Living people
Communist Party of Benin politicians
Anti-revisionists
Hoxhaists
Beninese academics
Place of birth missing (living people)